The 1898 Lafayette football team was an American football team that represented Lafayette College as an independent during the 1898 college football season. In its first season under head coach Samuel B. Newton, the team compiled a 3–8 record. Charles Best was the team captain. The team played its home games at March Field in Easton, Pennsylvania.

Schedule

References

Lafayette
Lafayette Leopards football seasons
Lafayette football